Carmel Bernon Harvey Jr. (October 6, 1946 – June 21, 1967) was a United States Army soldier and a recipient of the United States military's highest decoration—the Medal of Honor—for his actions in the Vietnam War.

Biography
Harvey joined the Army from his hometown in the Hegewisch community area of Chicago, Illinois in 1965, and by June 21, 1967, was serving as a specialist four in Company B, 1st Battalion, 5th Cavalry Regiment, 1st Cavalry Division (Airmobile). During a firefight on that day, in Binh Dinh Province, Republic of Vietnam, an enemy bullet hit and activated a hand grenade attached to Harvey's belt. Unable to remove the live device from his belt, he ran towards an enemy machinegun emplacement until the grenade exploded, killing him and momentarily halting the enemy's fire.

Harvey, aged 20 at his death, was buried in Cedar Park Cemetery, Calumet Park, Illinois. Olive-Harvey College, one of the City Colleges of Chicago is named after him and fellow Medal of Honor recipient Milton L. Olive, III. A fitness center on Fort Hood is also named after Harvey. The auditorium of George Washington High School in Chicago, which serves his home community of Hegewisch, is named Harvey Hall in his honor.

Medal of Honor citation

See also

List of Medal of Honor recipients
List of Medal of Honor recipients for the Vietnam War

References

1946 births
1967 deaths
American military personnel killed in the Vietnam War
United States Army Medal of Honor recipients
Military personnel from Chicago
People from Montgomery, West Virginia
United States Army soldiers
Vietnam War recipients of the Medal of Honor
Military personnel from West Virginia
United States Army personnel of the Vietnam War